Robert Dressler may refer to:
 Rob Dressler (born 1954), baseball player
 Robert A. Dressler (born 1945), lawyer and politician
 Robert Louis Dressler (born 1927), orchidologist